EWI (from electronic wind instrument, pronounced EE-wee) is a type of wind controller, an electronic musical instrument invented by Nyle Steiner. The EWI has been used by many artists across many different genres.

History

The EWI was invented by Nyle Steiner, his second electronic wind instrument design. Steiner originally brought to market a brass style fingering analogue wind synthesizer instrument known as the EVI in the 1970s. Steiner then went on to develop the EWI which had a unique fingering system closer to the woodwind style. These instrument designs first working models appeared in the 1970s, with the EWI appearing commercially during the early 1980s.

Operation
EWI models can control external synthesizers or other MIDI instruments, either simultaneously or instead of the synthesizers that come with the instrument. Earlier EWIs require the external box unit, while the discontinued (as of 2019) EWI4000s and still currently available EWI5000 have built-in MIDI outputs. The newest EWI SOLO and the now discontinued (as of 2022) EWI USB have only a USB connector. In 2021 a small volume (cottage industry) company Berglund also makes its own original variations on classic Steiner EVI and EWI designs, approved and demonstrated by Nyle Steiner himself. The Berglund designs offer MIDI over wireless, unlike the current Akai products (as of 2022).  Wireless MIDI can be achieved on the Akai models with unofficial third party add on products at lower cost, albeit in a somewhat DIY fashion.

Any EWI can play software synthesizers running on a computer.

The early models of EWI and EVI consisted of two parts: a wind controller and a digitally-controlled analog synthesizer in a rackmount box (which also houses the instrument's electronics). Akai took over the EVI and EWI instruments from Steiner and released several models with his help. Today Akai only makes designs based around the EWI, having dropped the less commercially successful EVI. The current Akai models EWI5000, and EWI SOLO contain built-in sample-based digital synthesizers and don't strictly require an external box. Akai also offered the EWI USB, a five-octave MIDI controller that connects directly to a Mac or Windows computer via USB and uses software for control.

Fingering system
EWIs, depending on the brand (Akai or Berglund; the latter referred to as NuRad), can use the Boehm fingering system used by most woodwind instruments, or other fingerings, like that of the recorder or tin whistle. The instrument feels somewhat like a soprano saxophone or clarinet, except that its keys are activated by touch rather than being depressed (i.e. the player's fingers don't rest on the keys).

Nyle Steiner's EWI fingering was novel because it does not operate as an acoustic instrument. Instead of closing or opening a hole, each EWI key acts as a pitch modifier that can change note values by plus or minus a half step or whole step. As a result, fingerings that are similar to that of a Boehm instrument, but many other alternate fingers are possible on EWI that are not possible on acoustic instruments. This gave Steiner's invention flexibility yet remains familiar to woodwind players.
Later generation EWIs can be switched to flute, oboe, and saxophone fingering modes. The EWI 5000 and EWI USB also have an electronic valve instrument (EVI) fingering mode that allows brass players to play the EWI. Like a straight soprano saxophone or clarinet, the EWI is straight with a slight inward bend a few inches below the mouthpiece, and it is held in front of the body with a neck strap.
The EWI has a silicone mouthpiece with sensors for air pressure (sending MIDI Breath Control by default) and bite pressure (which sends vibrato, more specifically a quick pitch up-down "blip" by default, but can also be routed to modulation or other CC controls of the player's preference). Because the EWI keys do not move (instead, they sense when fingers are touching them by body capacitance). Owing to the touch capacitative switches and breath and bite sensors the instrument is highly responsive, however, this sensitive nature of the touch capacitative switches does not immediately appeal to all players, some of which may prefer electronic wind instruments with mechanical buttons on which they can rest their fingers, more similar to a saxophone, though a short period of adjustment will allow wind players to easily adapt. It also requires substantially less breath control than an acoustic instrument; breath sensitivity is one of the parameters that can be adjusted to the player's preference.

Unlike acoustic wind instruments, the fingering is identical in every octave. The current octave is determined by putting your left thumb between any two of the four to eight rollers (*depending on model), and also by rolling the thumb to the ends of the EWI USB roller track to achieve the fifth octave from just the four-octave rollers on that model. Touching a plate next to the rollers sends portamento by default (this portamento strip is not on the EWI USB).  EWI USB and EWI 5000 also have pitch bend up and down plates all operated by the right thumb. The latest EWI known as Solo only has pitch bend down plate so the player has to scoop up from the bottom pitch down plate before blowing a note for an upwards pitch bend which will be of a more limited range compared to all the other twin bend plate EWI models; this sacrifice apparently made as the thumb hold at the same position also supports the greater weight of the instrument. The Solo however has seen the addition of a dedicated F# key to the EWI key sensors. A key not seen before on previous EWI models, which should be welcome for players using the saxophone fingering mode instead of traditional EWI.

Notable players

 Michael Brecker
 Takeshi Itoh
 Masato Honda
 Bob Mintzer
 Steve Tavaglione
 Darren Barrett
 John Daversa
 John Swana
 Seamus Blake
 Chase Baird
 Dev Hynes
 Tony O'Connor (composer)
 Jeff Kashiwa
 Everette Harp
 Richard Elliot
 Candy Dulfer
 Dave Koz
 Chad Lefkowitz-Brown
 Laura Intravia
 Jørgen Munkeby
 Courtney Pine
 Marshall Allen
 Wenzl McGowen
 John L. Walters

References

External links
 Wind Synthesizers; John L. Walters compares and contrasts the Yamaha WX7 wind controller and the Akai EWI wind synthesizer, first published in Sound on Sound magazine, December 1987.
 A review of the Akai EWI4000s by Jonathan Block
 Live looping using the Akai EWI4000s by Jonathan Block (posted by the copyright holder)

Akai synthesizers
Electronic wind instruments